Wyoming is a village and census-designated place on the Wood River in southern Rhode Island, primarily in the town of Richmond, Rhode Island, but extending north across the river (which defines the town line) into the town of Hopkinton, Rhode Island. The population was 270 at the 2010 census. It is the site of the Wyoming Village Historic District and a post office assigned ZIP code 02898.

History 
The village was settled in 1757 and was the site of industrial activity early in its history due to the ready availability of hydropower from the river. Brand's Iron Works existed on the Hopkinton side of the river by 1787, and Brothers Cotton Mill was established on the Richmond side of Wyoming in 1814. The New London Turnpike (Rhode Island Route 3) was built through the area in 1815. Also in 1815 a tavern was established on the Richmond side of the river to serve travelers on the turnpike. Two more textile mills were built on the Richmond, circa 1830 and 1845; they were later destroyed by fire.

In 1970, Interstate 95 was constructed a short distance east of Wyoming, with an exit close to the village. Proximity to the highway has led to commercial and residential development in and near the village.

Historic district 
The Wyoming Village Historic District is a historic district roughly bounded by Rhode Island Routes 138 and 3, Old Nooseneck Hill Road, Bridge and Prospect Streets in Richmond. The district, which includes Brand's Ironworks,  includes examples of Greek Revival, Late Victorian, and Federal architecture and was added to the National Register of Historic Places in 1974. Prospect Street on the Hopkinton side of the river is a residential neighborhood that grew up in the mid-19th century in connection with the growth of the textile industry in Wyoming; it includes several Greek Revival houses built between 1846 and 1850.

Geography 
According to the United States Census Bureau, the Wyoming CDP has a total area of 0.91 square miles (2.3 km), of which 0.86 square miles (2.2 km) is land and 0.05 square miles (0.1 km) (4.96%) is water.

Demographics 
The portion of Wyoming in the town of Hopkinton is included in the census-designated place of Hope Valley.

See also
National Register of Historic Places listings in Washington County, Rhode Island

References

External links

 

Federal architecture in Rhode Island
Historic districts on the National Register of Historic Places in Rhode Island
Villages in Washington County, Rhode Island
Census-designated places in Washington County, Rhode Island
Hopkinton, Rhode Island
Richmond, Rhode Island
Providence metropolitan area
Villages in Rhode Island
Census-designated places in Rhode Island
National Register of Historic Places in Washington County, Rhode Island